Local elections were held in Isiolo County to elect a Governor and County Assembly on 4 March 2013. Under the new constitution, which was passed in a 2010 referendum, the 2013 general elections were the first in which Governors and members of the County Assemblies for the newly created counties were elected.  They will also be the first general elections run by the Independent Electoral and Boundaries Commission(IEBC) which has released the official list of candidates.

Gubernatorial election

Prospective candidates
The following are some of the candidates who have made public their intentions to run: 
 Godana Doyo - a lawyer 
 Abdul Bahari Ali - Isiolo South MP
 Yussuf Dogo  - Coordinator, Friends of Nomads 
 Domiciano Mainge - Businessman

County Assembly
Elected representatives included:
Isiolo North - Joseph Samal 
Isiolo South - Abdullah Jaldesa Banticha

References

 

2013 local elections in Kenya